Kate Cooper Austin (July 25, 1864 – October 28, 1902) was an American journalist and advocate of feminist and anarchist causes.

Early life
Born Catherine Cooper on July 25, 1864, in LaSalle County, Illinois Austin moved with her family to Hook's Point, Iowa, when she was six. At the age of 11, Austin lost her mother and had to raise her seven brothers and sisters. Due to having a bitter taste of life, Austin learned how to read as it became one of her amusements.

Career
It was in Hook's Point, Iowa, that she married a young farmer, Sam Austin, in August 1883. Around the same time, her father discovered Lucifer, an anarchist/free love journal published by Moses Harman. Austin and her entire family were influenced by Hamon's writings, but it was the Haymarket Riot of 1886 and the ensuing reaction that brought Austin to anarchism.

A member of the American Press Writers' Association, Austin wrote for many working-class and radical newspapers. She also contributed to Lucifer and to anarchist periodicals such as The Firebrand, Free Society, Discontent, and The Demonstrator.  Austin's interests included sexual reform and the economic status of working people.  In 1897 and 1899, Emma Goldman visited Austin at her home in Caplinger Mills, Missouri, where she gave several well-attended lectures.

Personal life
In 1890, Austin and her husband, Sam Austin, both moved to Caplinger Mills, Missouri, about twenty miles away from the nearest railroad station. Austin did not feel any type of isolation, as country life was her ideal. Since Austin joined the American Press Writers Association, her work increased as she came in contact with many well known radical writers and lecturers of her time, keeping her busy reading and writing. She enjoyed it, as it was an important part of her education.

Austin died of consumption on October 28, 1902, in Kingman, Kansas, leaving behind nine children aged between 19 and 10. Austin's body was sent back to Caplinger Mills, as a funeral was held for her with the largest crowd that ever attended a funeral in that district. Austin is buried north of Caplinger Mills in Hackleman Cemetery.

References

External links

"Woman", an unpublished 1901 essay by Austin at Wikisource
"An Open Letter to James F. Morton, Jr." , Free Society, Vol. IX. No. 24, Whole No. 366 (June 15, 1902). 2–3

1864 births
1902 deaths
19th-century American journalists
19th-century American non-fiction writers
19th-century American women writers
Activists from Illinois
Activists from Iowa
Activists from Missouri
American anarchists
American feminists
American women journalists
American women non-fiction writers
American women's rights activists
Anarcha-feminists
Anarchist writers
Anarcho-communists
Free love advocates
Journalists from Illinois
Journalists from Iowa
Journalists from Missouri
People from Cedar County, Missouri
People from LaSalle County, Illinois